Megachile mutala is a species of bee in the family Megachilidae. It was described by Strand in 1912.

References

Mutala
Insects described in 1912